Adin Ballou (1803–1890) was an American proponent of Christian nonresistance, Christian anarchism, and Christian socialism. He was also an abolitionist and the founder of the Hopedale Community. Through his long career as a Universalist and Unitarian minister, he tirelessly advocated for the immediate abolition of slavery and the principles of Christian anarcho-socialism, and promoted the nonviolent theory of praxis (or moral suasion) in his prolific writings. Such writings drew the admiration of Leo Tolstoy, who frequently cited Ballou as a major influence on his theological and political ideology in his nonfiction texts like The Kingdom of God is Within You, along with sponsoring Russian translations of some of Ballou's works. As well as heavily inspiring Tolstoy, Ballou's Christian anarchist and nonresistance ideals in texts like Practical Christianity were passed down from Tolstoy to Mahatma Gandhi, contributing not only to the nonviolent resistance movement in the Russian Revolution led by the Tolstoyans but also Gandhi's early thinkings on the nonviolent theory of praxis and the development of his first ashram, the Tolstoy Farm. In a recent publication, the American philosopher and anarchist Crispin Sartwell wrote that the works by Ballou and his other Christian anarchist contemporaries like William Lloyd Garrison directly influenced Gandhi and Martin Luther King Jr.

Ballou was a prominent local historian for Milford and wrote one of the earliest complete histories of the town in 1882, "History of the town of Milford, Worcester county, Massachusetts, from its first settlement to 1881".

Ballou became a lifelong advocate of Christian pacifism by 1838. Standard of Practical Christianity was composed in 1839 by Ballou and a few ministerial colleagues and laymen. The signatories announced their withdrawal from "the governments of the world." They believed the dependence on force to maintain order was unjust and vowed to not participate in such government. While they did not acknowledge the earthly rule of man, they also did not rebel or "resist any of their ordinances by physical force." "We cannot employ carnal weapons nor any physical violence whatsoever," they proclaimed, "not even for the preservation of our lives. We cannot render evil for evil... nor do otherwise than 'love our enemies.'"

In 1843, he began to serve as president of the New England Non-Resistance Society.

See also
 Peace churches

References

Further reading

External links

 
 
 Friends of Adin Ballou
 Christian Non-Resistance in All Its Important Bearings (his principal work on pacifism)
 Anarchy Archives Section on Ballou.

1803 births
1890 deaths
19th-century Christian universalists
Activists from Massachusetts
Activists from Rhode Island
American abolitionists
American anarchists
American Christian pacifists
American Christian socialists
American temperance activists
Christian abolitionists
Christian anarchists
Christian radicals
Clergy of the Universalist Church of America
Founders of utopian communities
People from Cumberland, Rhode Island
People from Hopedale, Massachusetts
People from Mendon, Massachusetts
Tolstoyans
Unitarian socialists
Utopian socialists
19th-century American clergy